Jackie Flowers (born March 4, 1958) is a former professional American football wide receiver in the United States Football League for the Arizona Wranglers, Chicago Blitz, Pittsburgh Maulers and the Orlando Renegades. He also played in the National Football League for the Tampa Bay Buccaneers. He played college football at Florida State University.

Early years
Flowers was a standout wide receiver at William M. Raines High School, graduating in 1976. He accepted a football scholarship from Florida State University where he was a four-year letterman. 

In 1978, he made 43 catches for 757 yards (led the team) and 7 touchdowns, earning honorable-mention All-American honors. 

In his senior year, he caught 37 passes for 622 yards (led the team), 7 touchdowns, a 2-point conversion reception and was named second-team All-American. Against Memphis State University, he had 9 receptions for 117 yards and one touchdown.

He finished his college career as the school's fifth-leading receiver with 102 receptions for 1,730 yards (17-yards per catch) and 15 touchdowns.

College statistics

* Includes bowl games.

Professional career

Dallas Cowboys
Flowers was selected by the Dallas Cowboys in the ninth round (246th overall) of the 1980 NFL Draft, after dropping because he lacked speed and was seen as a possession receiver. On August 25, he was waived in pre-season after the Cowboys decided to keep only 3 wide receivers on the roster.

Tampa Bay Buccaneers
In December 1980, he was signed as a free agent by the Tampa Bay Buccaneers. In 1981, he was placed on the injured reserve list with a knee injury, before being released the next year.

Arizona Wranglers (USFL)
In 1983, Flowers jumped to the  Arizona Wranglers of the United States Football League after being out of football for a year, registering 63 receptions for 869 yards and 11 touchdowns, including the longest reception (98 yards) in league history. At the end of the season, Wranglers owner Jim Joseph did an unprecedented swap of franchises with Chicago Blitz owner Ted Diethrich. Diethrich sold the Blitz to James Hoffman, then bought the Wranglers from Joseph. Hoffman and Diethrich then engineered a swap of assets in which Allen, the Blitz coaching staff and most of its players moved to Phoenix while most of the Wranglers roster moved to Chicago.

Chicago Blitz (USFL)
In 1984, he played for the Chicago Blitz with head coach Marv Levy. On March 19, he was traded to the Pittsburgh Maulers in exchange for a draft choice.

Pittsburgh Maulers (USFL)
In 1984, Flowers was one of the league's best wide receivers with the Pittsburgh Maulers, leading the team with 46 catches for 881 yards and 8 touchdowns. The next year owner Edward J. DeBartolo, Sr. folded the team, after the USFL announced that they would be switching to a fall schedule in 1986.

Orlando Renegades (USFL)
In 1985, he signed with the Orlando Renegades for what would become the final season of USFL operations, registering 30 catches for 373 yards and 5 touchdowns.

References

1958 births
Living people
William M. Raines High School alumni
Players of American football from Jacksonville, Florida
American football wide receivers
Florida State Seminoles football players
Tampa Bay Buccaneers players
Arizona Wranglers players
Chicago Blitz players
Pittsburgh Maulers players
Washington Federals/Orlando Renegades players